The  is the ambassador from the United States of America to Japan.

History
Since the opening of Japan by Commodore Matthew C. Perry, in 1854, the U.S. has maintained diplomatic relations with Japan, except for the ten-year period between the attack on Pearl Harbor in 1941 (and the subsequent declaration of war on Japan by the United States) and the signing of the Treaty of San Francisco, which normalized relations between the United States and Japan. The United States maintains an embassy in Tokyo, with consulates-general in Osaka, Nagoya, Sapporo, Fukuoka, and Naha.

Due to the significance of the relations between the two countries in recent years on trade and defense, with Japan being described by the United States State Department as "the cornerstone of the U.S. security interests in Asia,"  the post has been held by many significant American politicians, including Mike Mansfield, Walter Mondale, Tom Foley and Howard Baker.

List of chiefs of mission
The following is a list of chiefs of mission.

Resident ministers

Envoys extraordinary and ministers plenipotentiary

Ambassadors extraordinary and plenipotentiary

Notes

See also
Ambassadors of the United States
Japanese Ambassador to the United States
Embassy of the United States in Tokyo
Embassy of Japan in Washington, D.C.
Foreign relations of the United States
Foreign relations of Japan
Japan–United States relations
Convention of Kanagawa
Treaty of Amity and Commerce (United States–Japan)
Security Treaty Between the United States and Japan
Treaty of San Francisco
Treaty of Mutual Cooperation and Security between the United States and Japan
United States Forces Japan
U.S.–Japan Status of Forces Agreement

References
U.S. ambassador a role most vital
United States Department of State: Background notes on Japan

External links
 United States Department of State: Chiefs of Mission for Japan
 United States Department of State: Japan
 United States Embassy in Tokyo

Japan
 
United States